The Jazz Age, his fourteenth studio album, is a re-recording of some of Bryan Ferry's compositions, as played in the jazz style of the 1920s, by The Bryan Ferry Orchestra. The 13 songs have been chosen from 11 albums, from his very first release Roxy Music (1972) to his then most recent solo record, Olympia (2010). The album was co-produced by Ferry and Rhett Davies, with arrangements by Colin Good, and released on 26 November 2012 as a 10in vinyl folio edition and on 12in vinyl, CD and digital download, on BMG Rights Management.

Ferry himself does not perform on the album, which consists entirely of instrumental performances.  Talking about the inspiration behind the reinterpretations, Ferry told Clash, "I've sort of gone back to the music that I liked listening to when I was a young lad, nine or ten years old - I was really fairly precocious for that time." Interviewed for The Telegraph, he added, "It came out of the desire to make an instrumental album of my songs. I was fascinated to see how they would stand up without singing."

The album is Ferry's lowest charting of his career, peaking at #50 on the UK Albums Chart.

Cover Art
The artwork for The Jazz Age album consists of illustrations by the renowned French poster artist Paul Colin (1892–1985). The album cover and internal booklet include elements from his 'Le Tumult Noir' portfolio of 1929. The introduction to an exhibition at the Smithsonian Institution, National Portrait Gallery states: "In 1925, Josephine Baker and her troupe, 'La Revue Nègre', exploded on the Paris stage with a wild new dance called the Charleston. The Jazz Age was at its height, and Baker was destined to become its high priestess. Four years later, French poster artist Paul Colin, Baker's one-time lover and life-long friend, published a portfolio of vividly colored lithographs titled "Le Tumulte Noir" ("The Black Craze") which captured the exuberant jazz music and dance that dazzled Paris."

Sound Design & Production
The Jazz Age was recorded at Bryan Ferry’s own personal studio/office complex, Studio One, located at Avonmore Place in Olympia, London, England.  Using some of the best available British jazz musicians, playing the standard instrumentation of the 1920’s, in arrangements by pianist Colin Good (Ferry’s musical director for ten years) in the Jazz Age style, with a banjo rhythm, and lead clarinets, it was produced (by Ferry and Rhett Davies) and engineered (by Simon Willey & David Phelan) to achieve an authentic 1920’s sound as well. Recorded in 2012, with all the tools available at the time, but used to produce a vintage sound (Ferry’s original conceit?) as if these are the ‘lost’ recordings of the original ‘Roxy Music Band’ unearthed from the archives, being played on your great-grandparents’ old Victrola.

Critical Reception
Reviewing for AllMusic, Thom Jurek said, "All 13 of these tunes have been wildly revamped and offer interesting textures", "...but the music here is played so well, it doesn't feel gimmicky." concluding, "Given that Ferry doesn't sing on The Jazz Age, the appeal for casual fans is debatable. But for the faithful, trad-jazz heads, and open-minded listeners, the musical quality -- from expert arrangements, virtuosic playing, and the brilliant concept -- offer something wholly different and rewarding."

Chris Roberts, writing for the BBC Music Reviews, sees a natural development of his solo career: "Bryan Ferry, never averse to a re-make/re-model (as his lifelong parallel career as a covers-crooner of "ready-mades" has established), has cooked up something completely unexpected and unprecedented here." "As fascinating as it is perplexing, anything but obvious, and therefore to be applauded."

In his Pitchfork review (2013) Ned Raggett considers the absence of Ferry's vocal, "If anyone is the lead "voice" throughout it would be [trumpeter Enrico] Tomasso or saxophonists Alan Barnes and Richard White, whose various solo turns on a number of songs take the place of the singing. As a result, it becomes a strangely affecting blend-- Ferry is here almost by implication, a certain unavoidably melancholic sigh that emerges in hints in the arrangements, even at their merriest."

Legacy
Film director Baz Luhrmann asked to use Ferry's song "Love Is the Drug" from The Jazz Age album for the 2013 film The Great Gatsby. This resulted in a collaboration with The Bryan Ferry Orchestra to create several jazz pieces throughout the movie, released as a separate album titled The Great Gatsby – The Jazz Recordings (A Selection of Yellow Cocktail Music). Ferry began touring with The Bryan Ferry Orchestra in 2013, including a performance at the 2013 Cannes Film Festival which was opened by Luhrmann's The Great Gatsby film.

Track listing
All songs were written by Bryan Ferry except where noted.

 "Do The Strand" – 2:10
 "Love Is the Drug" – 3:14 (Ferry, Andy Mackay)
 "Don’t Stop The Dance" – 2:51 (Ferry, Rhett Davies)
 "Just Like You" – 3:24
 "Avalon" – 2:23
 "The Bogus Man" – 2:07
 "Slave to Love" – 2:38
 "This Is Tomorrow" – 2:27
 "The Only Face" – 2:57
 "I Thought" – 2:36 (Ferry, Brian Eno)
 "Reason Or Rhyme" – 4:15
 "Virginia Plain" – 2:14
 "This Island Earth" – 4:24

Personnel 
 Bryan Ferry – bandleader, composer
 Colin Good – grand piano, arrangements
 Martin Wheatley –  guitars, banjo
 Chris Laurence – double bass
 John Sutton – drums
 Frank Ricotti – percussion
 Richard White – alto saxophone, bass saxophone, bass clarinet, clarinet
 Alan Barnes – baritone saxophone, clarinet
 Robert Fowler – tenor saxophone, clarinet
 Malcolm Earle Smith – trombone
 Enrico Tomasso – trumpet, cornet
 Katy Cox – cello
 Sarah Chapman – viola
 Emma Owens – viola
 Emma Parker – violin
 Victoria Sutherland – violin

Production 
 Bryan Ferry – producer, liner notes 
 Rhett Davies – producer, recording, mixing 
 Simon Willey – engineer, recording, mixing 
 David Phelan – assistant engineer
 Bob Ludwig – mastering 
 Paul Colin – illustrations
 Richard White – liner notes 
 Alistair Norbury – management

Studios
 Recorded and Mixed at Studio One (Olympia, London, UK).
 Mastered at Gateway Mastering (Portland, Maine, USA).

References

External links
Bryan Ferry's site

2012 albums
Bryan Ferry albums
Instrumental albums
Albums produced by Rhett Davies